José Eugenio De León Domenech (born August 7, 1992) is a Puerto Rican professional baseball pitcher in the Minnesota Twins organization. He has played in Major League Baseball (MLB) for the Los Angeles Dodgers, Tampa Bay Rays, and Cincinnati Reds.

Career

Los Angeles Dodgers
De León played college baseball at Southern University from 2011 to 2013. He was drafted by the Los Angeles Dodgers in the 24th round of the 2013 Major League Baseball Draft. He signed with the Dodgers and made his professional debut with the Arizona League Dodgers. He was later promoted to the Ogden Raptors. De León returned to Ogden to start the 2014 season. After recording a 2.65 earned run average (ERA) and 77 strikeouts in  innings, he was promoted to the Great Lakes Loons. In his second start with the Loons, De León had 14 strikeouts, breaking Clayton Kershaw's team record of 12 set in 2007. In four starts with Great Lakes, he had a 1.19 ERA with 42 strikeouts in  innings. After the season, he was named the Pioneer League Pitcher of the Year, for his performance that season with Ogden.

De León was assigned to the Rancho Cucamonga Quakes of the California League to start the 2015 season. In seven starts for the Quakes he was 4–1 with a 1.67 ERA and he was promoted to the AA Tulsa Drillers of the Texas League on May 18. He was selected to the California League mid-season all-star team but was unable to participate because of his promotion to AA. He was selected as a second team Baseball America minor league all-star after the season. He had a 2–6 record in AA with a 3.64 ERA and 105 strikeouts. He was given a non-roster invitation to Dodgers spring training. In 2016, he spent the season in AAA with the Oklahoma City Dodgers, where he was 7–1 with a 2.61 ERA in 16 starts. He also struck out 111 batters against only 20 walks.

De León had his contract purchased by the Dodgers and was called up to the majors on September 3, 2016, making his debut as the starting pitcher for the Dodgers against the San Diego Padres on September 4. He allowed four runs in six innings in his debut to pick up the win. His nine strikeouts (with no walks) was the second most by a Los Angeles Dodgers pitcher in his debut, trailing only Pedro Astacio and Kazuhisa Ishii. In four starts for the Dodgers he was 2–0 with a 6.35 ERA.

Tampa Bay Rays
On January 23, 2017, the Dodgers traded De León to the Tampa Bay Rays in exchange for second baseman Logan Forsythe. De León started the 2017 season ranked as the Rays' third best prospect and 28th overall by MLB Pipeline. He opened the season on the minor league disabled list due to discomfort in the flexor mass muscle in the forearm, which is often a precursor to Tommy John surgery.

On May 29, De León got his first call-up by the Rays due to a depleted bullpen from a 15 inning victory against the Minnesota Twins the day before. In his Rays debut, he allowed three runs on four hits, two walks, and two strikeouts in 2 innings pitched, and took the win. He was sent back down the next day.

On June 9, De León was put on the minor league disabled list with a mild lat strain. On August 14, De León was placed on the minor league disabled list for the third time in 2017, this time with elbow tendinitis. De León was diagnosed with a torn ulnar collateral ligament on March 7, 2018.  One week later, Dr. James Andrews successfully performed Tommy John surgery, ending De León's 2018 season. De León returned to game action in May 2019. He returned to the Rays active roster on August 14.

Cincinnati Reds
On November 20, 2019, the Rays traded De León to the Cincinnati Reds in exchange for cash considerations or a player to be named later. In 2020 for Cincinnati, De León registered an 18.00 ERA with 10 strikeouts in six innings of work across five appearances.

De León posted a 4.63 ERA in 12 games for the Triple-A Louisville Bats, but struggled to an 8.35 ERA in 9 games with Cincinnati before being designated for assignment on July 19, 2021. De León was released by the Reds organization on July 23.

Boston Red Sox
On August 4, 2021, De León agreed to a minor league deal with the Boston Red Sox; he was assigned to the Worcester Red Sox. He became a free agent at the end of the season.

Toronto Blue Jays
On November 29, 2021, De Leon signed a minor league contract with the Toronto Blue Jays, and received an invitation to spring training. He elected free agency on November 10, 2022.

Minnesota Twins
On December 13, 2022, De León signed a minor league contract with the Minnesota Twins.

International career
During the 2023 World Baseball Classic (WBC), De León pitched for the Puerto Rico national team.  On March 13, 2023, he started versus Israel and retired every batter faced over  innings, including a WBC-record 10 strikeouts, to exit with an ongoing perfect game. Yacksel Ríos, Edwin Díaz, and Duane Underwood Jr. each relieved De León and retired every batter faced, and Martín Maldonado caught on the way to a 10–0 win.  The contest ended when Maldonado scored on a walk-off hit in the bottom of the eighth inning that invoked the tournament's mercy rule.  However, it did not qualify as an official perfect game per the Elias Sports Bureau, due to lasting fewer than nine innings.

See also 
 List of Major League Baseball players from Puerto Rico

References

External links

1992 births
Living people
People from Isabela, Puerto Rico
Major League Baseball players from Puerto Rico
Major League Baseball pitchers
2017 World Baseball Classic players
2023 World Baseball Classic players
Los Angeles Dodgers players
Tampa Bay Rays players
Cincinnati Reds players
Southern Jaguars baseball players
Arizona League Dodgers players
Ogden Raptors players
Criollos de Caguas players
Great Lakes Loons players
Rancho Cucamonga Quakes players
Tulsa Drillers players
Oklahoma City Dodgers players
Gulf Coast Rays players
Charlotte Stone Crabs players
Durham Bulls players
Liga de Béisbol Profesional Roberto Clemente pitchers
Louisville Bats players
Florida Complex League Red Sox players
Buffalo Bisons (minor league) players